Gustaw Lutkiewicz (29 June 1924 – 24 February 2017) was a Polish actor and singer.

He was born to a Polish family in Kaunas.

He was awarded the Knight's Cross of the Order of Polonia Restituta in 1970, the Officer's Cross in 1985 and the Medal for Merit to Culture - Gloria Artis  in 2012.

Selected filmography

2000: Syzyfowe prace
1999: With Fire and Sword under Jerzy Hoffman.
1991:  (as Konior) under Krzysztof Zanussi
1989: Konsul 
1985: C.K.Dezerterzy 
1984: Przeklęte oko proroka
1984: A Year of the Quiet Sun (as Bakery Owner) under Krzysztof Zanussi
1973: Copernicus
1970: Lokys (as Froeber)
1964: Nieznany (as Florczak)
1961: Ludzie z pociągu (as Kwaśniewski) 
1960: Walet pikowy
1957: Ewa chce spać
1957: Prawdziwy koniec wielkiej wojny (as Henryk Thiel) 
1956: Nikodem Dyzma

References

External links
 Biography at the www.filmpolski.pl 
 

1924 births
2017 deaths
Polish male film actors
Actors from Kaunas
Lithuanian people of Polish descent
Knights of the Order of Polonia Restituta
Officers of the Order of Polonia Restituta
Recipients of the Gold Cross of Merit (Poland)
Recipients of the Silver Medal for Merit to Culture – Gloria Artis